Ekplexite is a unique sulfide-hydroxide niobium-rich mineral with the formula . It is unique because niobium is usually found in oxide or, eventually, silicate minerals. Ekplexite is a case in which chalcophile behaviour of niobium is shown, which means niobium present in a sulfide mineral. The unique combination of elements in ekplexite has to do with its name, which comes from a Greek world on "surprise". The other example of chalcophile behaviour of niobium is edgarite, FeNb3S6, and both minerals were found in the same environment, which is a fenitic rock of Mt. Kaskasnyunchorr, Khibiny Massif, Kola Peninsula, Russia. Analysis of the same rock has revealed the presence of two analogues of ekplexite, kaskasite (molybdenum-analogue) and manganokaskasite (molybdenum- and manganese-analogue). All three minerals belong to the valleriite group, and crystallize in the trigonal system with similar possible space groups.

Notes on chemistry
Beside niobium, molybdenum, sulfur, magnesium and aluminium ekplexite contains also relatively small amounts of tungsten, vanadium and iron.

Association and environment
The rock in which contains ekplexite is classified as fenite. In this rock ekplexite associates with fluorophlogopite, nepheline, orthoclase-anorthoclasee (silicates), alabandine, edgarite, pyrite, molybdenite, tungstenite (sulfides), corundum, graphite and monazite-(Ce).

Crystal structure
Crystal structure of ekplexite is described as non-commensurate. It is composed of two modules:
 MeS2 sulfide module
 brucite-like (hydroxide) module

References

Niobium minerals
Magnesium minerals
Sulfide minerals
Hydroxide minerals
Trigonal minerals
Minerals in space group 150
Minerals in space group 156
Minerals in space group 164